The Faro de Moncloa is a -high transmission tower with an observation deck at the Plaza De Moncloa, Madrid, Spain. It was project by architect Salvador Pérez Arroyo and built in 1992.  The tower was closed to the public from 2005 to 2015, when new safety regulations were introduced after the Windsor Tower fire took place earlier that year. It reopened to the public in April 2015.

See also
Moncloa-Aravaca
List of towers

External links

 
http://www.skyscraperpage.com/diagrams/?b733

Towers completed in 1992
Communication towers in Spain
Buildings and structures in Ciudad Universitaria neighborhood, Madrid
Observation towers
1992 establishments in Spain